Dharanawas is a Jagir village of Varansurya-Charans in Jalore district of Rajasthan, India. It is 35 km far from Sanchore Tehsil.

Villages in Jalore district

Charan